Lady Macbeth of the Mtsensk District or Lady MacBeth of Mtensk may refer to:
 Lady Macbeth of the Mtsensk District (novel), by Nikolai Leskov 
 Lady Macbeth of the Mtsensk District (opera), by Dimitri Shostakovich
 Lady Macbeth of the Mtsensk District (film), film directed by Roman Balayan
 Siberian Lady Macbeth, film directed by Andrzej Wajda